The 1977 Italian Open was a combined men's and women's tennis tournament that was played by men on outdoor clay courts at the Foro Italico in Rome, Italy. The men's tournament was part of the Colgate-Palmolive Grand Prix circuit while the women's tournament was part of the Colgate Series. The tournament was held from 16 May through 22 May 1977. The singles titles were won by eight-seeded Vitas Gerulaitis and fifth-seeded Janet Newberry who earned $21,000 and $6,000 first-prize money respectively. Gerulaitis competed despite being contracted to play for the Indiana Loves World Team Tennis (WTT) franchise and was fined $19,000 for failing to play Björn Borg in the weekend of the final.

Finals

Men's singles
 Vitas Gerulaitis defeated  Antonio Zugarelli 6–2, 7–6, 3–6, 7–6

Women's singles
 Janet Newberry defeated  Renáta Tomanová 6–3, 7–6(7–5)

Men's doubles
 Brian Gottfried /  Raúl Ramírez defeated  Fred McNair /  Sherwood Stewart 6–7, 7–6, 7–5

Women's doubles
 Brigitte Cuypers /  Marise Kruger defeated  Bunny Bruning /  Sharon Walsh 3–6, 7–5, 6–2

References

External links
Women's Singles draw (WTA) 
Women's Doubles draw (WTA) 
ITF tournament details
ITN Source footage

 
Italian Open
Italian Open
Italian Open (tennis)
Italian Open